Ronald Neame CBE, BSC (23 April 1911 – 16 June 2010) was an English film producer, director, cinematographer, and screenwriter. Beginning his career as a cinematographer, for his work on the British war film One of Our Aircraft Is Missing (1943) he received an Academy Award nomination for Best Special Effects. During a partnership with director David Lean, he produced Brief Encounter (1945), Great Expectations (1946), and Oliver Twist (1948), receiving two Academy Award nominations for writing.

Neame then moved into directing, and some notable films included, The Man Who Never Was (1956), which chronicled Operation Mincemeat, a British WWII deception operation, The Prime of Miss Jean Brodie (1969), which won Maggie Smith her first Oscar, and the action-adventure disaster film The Poseidon Adventure (1972). He also directed I Could Go On Singing (1963), Judy Garland's last film, and Scrooge (1970), starring Albert Finney.

For his contributions to the film industry, in 1996 Neame was appointed a Commander of the Order of the British Empire (CBE) and received the BAFTA Academy Fellowship Award, the highest award the British Film Academy can give a filmmaker.

Early career
Born in Hendon, London, Neame was the son of photographer Elwin Neame and actress Ivy Close. He studied at University College School and Hurstpierpoint College. His father died in 1923, and Neame took a job with the Anglo-Persian Oil Company as an office boy. Later, through his mother's contacts in the British film industry, Neame started at Elstree Studios as a messenger boy.

He was fortunate enough to be hired as an assistant cameraman on Blackmail (1929), the first British talkie, directed by a young Alfred Hitchcock. Neame's own career as a cinematographer began with the musical comedy Happy (1933), and he continued to develop his skills in various "quota quickies" films for several years.

His credits as cinematographer include Major Barbara (1941), In Which We Serve (1942), This Happy Breed (1944), and Blithe Spirit (1945). His camera work on One of Our Aircraft Is Missing got him an Oscar nomination for Best Special Effects in 1943.

As producer and screenwriter
Neame formed a production company, Cineguild, with David Lean and Anthony Havelock-Allan. During this partnership, he produced Brief Encounter (1945), Great Expectations (1946), and Oliver Twist (1948). He shared Academy Award nominations for Best Screenplay for Brief Encounter, in 1947, and Great Expectations, in 1948, with co-writers Lean and Havelock-Allan.

Neame produced The Magic Box (1951), a screen biography directed by John Boulting about the life of British camera inventor William Friese-Greene, which was the film project for the Festival of Britain.

As director
Neame made his directorial debut under the Cineguild banner, with Take My Life (1947), which was released by British producer J. Arthur Rank's General Film Distributors in the United Kingdom in 1947 and by Rank's Eagle-Lion Films in the United States in 1949.  Neame began a transition to the American film industry at the suggestion of Rank, who asked him to study the Hollywood production system.

He worked again with Alec Guinness (whom he had worked with on Great Expectations and Oliver Twist), this time as director, in three films: The Card (1952), The Horse's Mouth (1958), and Tunes of Glory (1960). Neame described Tunes of Glory as "the film I am proudest of". He received two BAFTA Award nominations for Tunes of Glory. Neame and Guinness worked again on the musical Scrooge (1970) with Guinness playing the ghost of Jacob Marley to Albert Finney's Ebenezer Scrooge.

Neame also directed I Could Go On Singing (1963), Judy Garland's last film, co-starring Dirk Bogarde; and The Prime of Miss Jean Brodie (1969), which won Maggie Smith her first Oscar.

Neame was recruited to direct The Poseidon Adventure (1972) after the contracted director left the production. He later characterised The Poseidon Adventure as "my favourite film" because it earned him enough to retire comfortably. He enjoyed a long friendship with Walter Matthau, whom he directed in two later films, Hopscotch (1980) and First Monday in October (1981).

Neame's final feature-length film, Foreign Body, a comedy starring Victor Banerjee, was filmed in England and released in 1986.

Personal life
Neame married Beryl Heanly in 1933. They legally separated in 1971 and divorced in 1992. The couple had one son, Christopher, a writer/producer who died one year after his father's death. Ronald's only grandson, Gareth Neame, is a successful television producer, who represents the fourth generation of Neames in the film industry. Ronnie Neame's second marriage took place in Santa Barbara on 12 September 1993. His wife, Donna Bernice Friedberg, is also in the business – a film researcher and television producer, who worked on his 1979 movie Meteor. He referred to their meeting as a "coup de foudre".

In 1996 Neame was appointed a Commander of the Order of the British Empire (CBE) and awarded the BAFTA Fellowship for his contributions to the film industry. He had homes in Beverly Hills and Santa Barbara, California. In 2003 Neame published an autobiography, Straight from the Horse's Mouth.

Death
Neame died on 16 June 2010 after suffering complications from a broken leg. The break required two surgical procedures from which Neame never recovered.

In an interview in 2006, he jokingly stated, "When people ask me about the secret to my longevity, I say the honest answer is two large vodkas at lunchtime and three large scotches in the evening. All my doctors have said to me, 'Ronnie, if you would drink less, you'd live a lot longer.' But, they're all dead, and I'm still here at 95."

Selected filmography

Early films
Cinematographer (writer or producer where stated)

 Give Her a Ring (1934)
 Girls Will Be Boys (1934)
 Invitation to the Waltz (1935)
 Music Hath Charms (1935)
 Drake of England (1935)
 A Star Fell from Heaven (1936)
 The Improper Duchess (1936)
 King of the Castle (1936) cinematographer
 The Crimes of Stephen Hawke (1936)
 Variety Hour (1937)
 Cafe Colette (1937)
 Feather Your Nest (1937)
 Keep Fit (1937)
 It's in the Air (1938)
 I See Ice (1938)
 Who Goes Next? (1938)
 The Gaunt Stranger (1938)
 Penny Paradise (1938)
 The Ware Case (1938)
 Second Thoughts (1938)
 Young Man's Fancy (1939)
 Let's Be Famous (1939)
 Come on George! (1939)
 Trouble Brewing (1939)
 The Four Just Men (1939)
 Cheer Boys Cheer (1939)
Return to Yesterday (1940)
One of Our Aircraft Is Missing (1942)
 This Happy Breed (1944; also co-writer of the adaptation)
Blithe Spirit (1945; also co-writer of the adaptation)
 Brief Encounter (1945; producer)
Great Expectations (1946; also co-writer of the adaptation & producer)
 Take My Life (1947; director)
 Oliver Twist (1948; producer)
 The Passionate Friends (1949; producer)

Director

 Golden Salamander (1950)
 The Magic Box (1951)
 The Card (1952)
 The Million Pound Note (1953; director & producer)
 The Man Who Never Was (1956)
 The Seventh Sin (1957)
 Windom's Way (1957)
 The Horse's Mouth (1958; director & producer)
 Tunes of Glory (1960)
 Escape from Zahrain (1962; director & producer)
 I Could Go On Singing (1963)
 The Chalk Garden (1964)
 Mister Moses (1965)
 A Man Could Get Killed (1966)
 Gambit (1966)
 Prudence and the Pill (1968)
 The Prime of Miss Jean Brodie (1969)
 Scrooge (1970)
 The Poseidon Adventure (1972)
 The Odessa File (1974)
 Meteor (1979)
 Hopscotch (1980)
 First Monday in October (1981)
 Foreign Body (1986)
 The Magic Balloon (1990)

Actor
 Meteor (1979; as British Representative)

References

Sources

External links
 
 
 Ronald Neame: Director, writer, producer and cinematographer celebrated for bringing the best out of his actors, Tom Vallance, The Independent, 22 June 2010

1911 births
2010 deaths
BAFTA fellows
Commanders of the Order of the British Empire
English cinematographers
English film directors
English film producers
English screenwriters
English male screenwriters
People educated at University College School
People educated at Hurstpierpoint College
Writers from London
Ronald
20th-century English businesspeople